Tirazayi or Tere Zayi is one of the districts of Khost Province, Afghanistan. It is situated in the northeast of the province. It borders Khost and Sabari districts to the west, Bak District to the north and Pakistan to the east. The population is 49,617. The district center is Aliser, located in the western part of the district.

References

External links
AIMS District Map

Districts of Khost Province